"I Need You Now" is a popular song written by Jimmie Crane and Al Jacobs.

The recorded version by Eddie Fisher reached number 1 on Billboard charts in 1954

Background
The song was written for Joni James who recorded the song in April 1953 for M-G-M Records, and the song was released on her best-selling album, Let There Be Love. Eddie Fisher subsequently recorded a version of it accompanied by Hugo Winterhalter and his Orchestra at Webster Hall, New York City, on May 4, 1954. The song was released by RCA Victor Records backed with "Heaven Was Never Like This" (catalog number 20-5830) in August 1954. and by EMI on the His Master's Voice label as catalog number B 10755.  Fisher's recording reached number 1 on Billboard as well as Cash Box charts in November 1954. It was ranked number 13 on Billboard's 1954's Top Popular Records according to records sales, and number 12 according to disk jockey plays.

Because M-G-M had already had three major songs scheduled in sequence for release ("My Love, My Love" and "I'll Never Stand in Your Way" and "I Need You Now," all done at the same recording session!) when the Fisher version was released, it was not possible for M-G-M to market the James original at that point. Seven years later, Joni James recorded a new version of "I Need You Now", at Abbey Road Studios in London.  It was released as a single in 1960. Jacobs and Crane later gave James another song "My Believing Heart," which became the follow-up to her million selling "You Are My Love."

Charts

Other versions
This song was recorded as a demo by Jerry Lee Lewis in 1954.
The song was also performed by Russell Arms on several 1954 episodes of the popular TV series Your Hit Parade. A kinescope of one of these performances survives and can be viewed online.
Floyd Cramer - included in his album Last Date (1960).
Bing Crosby recorded the song in 1954 for use on his radio show and it was subsequently included in the box set The Bing Crosby CBS Radio Recordings (1954-56) issued by Mosaic Records (catalog MD7-245) in 2009. 
Ronnie Dove reached number 93 on the Hot 100 in 1969 with his version.  It was his last entry on that chart.
Hank Locklin (1962)
Les Paul and Mary Ford - included in their EP release for Capitol Records Les Paul and Mary Ford (1954).

References

Number-one singles in the United States
1954 songs
Eddie Fisher (singer) songs
Songs written by Jimmie Crane
Songs written by Al Jacobs